LC1 or LC-1 may refer to:

 Launch Complex 1 (disambiguation)
 Cape Canaveral Air Force Station Launch Complex 1, an American rocket launch site
 Xichang Launch Complex 1, part of the Xichang Satellite Launch Center
 Gagarin's Start, a Russian Space launch site
 SpaceX Landing Complex 1, Space Coast, Florida, USA
 N&W LC-1, an electric railway locomotive
 Lancia LC1, a sport car
 LC1 (classification), a Paralympic cycling classification

See also

 
 
 LCI (disambiguation)
 LCL (disambiguation)

 ICI (disambiguation)
 ICL (disambiguation)

 LC (disambiguation)